Bahari Constituency was an electoral constituency in Kenya. It was one of three constituencies in Kilifi District, which is now Kilifi County. The constituency was established for the 1988 elections. In 2013, Bahari Constituency was dissolved and replaced by Kilifi South Constituency and Kilifi North Constituency.

Members of Parliament

Locations and wards

References

External links 
Map of the constituency

Former constituencies of Kenya
Constituencies in Coast Province
1988 establishments in Kenya
Constituencies established in 1988
Constituencies disestablished in 2013
2013 disestablishments in Kenya